The 2010–11 V AFG season was the 62nd season of the Bulgarian V AFG, the third tier of the Bulgarian football league system. The season started on 15 August 2010 and finished in May 2011. The group comprised four regional divisions with a different number of teams. Only the champion of each division was promoted to the B Group 2011/12.

Changes from the 2009–10 season

Movement between B PFG and V AFG
The champions of the four 2009–10 V AFG divisions were promoted to the 2010–11 B PFG: Dorostol Silistra from V AFG North-East and Ravda from V AFG South-East promoted to the B PFG East, Chavdar Byala Slatina from V AFG North-West and Malesh Mikrevo from V AFG South-West ascended to the B PFG West.

In return, Rodopa Smolyan, Belite Orli Pleven and Bdin Vidin were relegated from both 2009-10 B PFG groups. Rodopa and Belite Orli even did not receive a license for V AFG, so they will play in the regional divisions this season.

Movement from V Group to fourth-level leagues
The club of Aksakovo was relegated from the North-Eastern V AFG after the end of the season. The clubs of Ariston Ruse and Endzhe Tsari Brod were also relegated from this division, but because they resigned their participation during the season. In North-East V AFG promotion achieved the teams from Kubrat and Devnya. The team of F.C. Spartak Varna took the license of FC Topolite (the 16th-placed team in North-East division). Due to the huge similarity with the name of PFC Spartak Varna, the Regional football committee registered the new team under the name FC Topolite. Spartak Varna and Volov Shumen lost their professional license and went to play in this division. Volov Shumen unites with the team of Makak from Shumen Regional division, and the new team will be called Makak Shumen. On 27 July the executive committee of BFU decided that Razgrad will take the place of the bankrupted team of AKB Minyor in East B PFG.

In South-East V AFG there were also a lot of changes. Botev Plovdiv and Svilengrad lost their professional license and joined the South-East V AFG. Botev Plovdiv even was abolished as a team, but resurfaced after the new founding of the club and using the spot and license for Metalik Sopot. Strandzha-Metalurg Sredets decided to cancel their participation, so their spot was taken by the team of Rodopa Smolyan (the team lost their professional license from last season). The team of Levski Stara Zagora renamed themselves Tundzha Yagoda, but will play their home games at the Lokomotiv Stadium in Stara Zagora. From that division relegated Haskovo and Kosmos Burgas resigned from participation before the start of the last season. Asenovets and Chirpan promoted form the regional divisions.

North-West V AFG was joined by Lokomotiv Mezdra from A PFG and Bdin Vidin from B PFG. The teams of Pavlikeni and Belite orli decided to cancel their participation for this season. Samovodene and the re-emerged team of Spartak Pleven joined this division from the fourth level.

The South-West division was joined by Balkan Botevgrad and Rilski Sportist Samokov from B PFG. Later Rilski Sportist and Marek Dupnitsa were not granted a license for the South-West division. The team of Belasitsa Petrich decided to cancel their participation for this season. From the regional divisions came up the teams of Septemvri Sofia, Lokomotiv Septemvri and Avangard Bachevo, but on 12 August 2010 the zonal committee decided not to grant Avangard a license for participation in the South-West division. After the team of Avangard objected this ruling, they received the license.

Promotion to East B PFG

North-East V AFG

South-East V AFG

Promotion to West B PFG

North-West V AFG

South-West V AFG

References 

Third Amateur Football League (Bulgaria) seasons
3
Bulgaria